The 2022 World Seniors Darts Matchplay (known for sponsorship reasons as the 2022 JENNINGSbet World Seniors Darts Matchplay) was the first World Seniors Darts Matchplay organised by the World Seniors Darts Tour and was held at the Bonus Arena in Kingston upon Hull between 1–3 July 2022.

Robert Thornton won his second WSDT title, by defeating Phil Taylor 12–10 in the final, after Taylor missed two match darts to win the title. He had a dart whilst leading 8–6 at double 16, and also missed a dart at double 18 when leading 8–7. Thornton then brought the final to extra legs, which he eventually got two clear in to win 12–10.

Format
As with the World Matchplay tournaments organised by the Professional Darts Corporation, the Matchplay used the leg format, and the winner needing to be two legs clear at the winning post, with a game being extended if necessary for a maximum of six extra legs before a tie-break leg is required. For example, in a first to 8 legs first round match, if the score reaches 10–10 then the 21st leg will be the decider.

The preliminary and first rounds, as well as the quarter-finals will be the best of 15 legs (or first to 8 legs), and the semi-finals and final will be the best of 17 legs (or first to 9).

Prize money
The prize fund of £31,000 was announced in January, but that was before the tournament expanded to 20 players.

Qualifiers
On 7 January 2022, Phil Taylor and Martin Adams were announced as the first players in this 16-player, 2-day tournament.

On 23 February, the amount of participants was upped to 20, and the event was extended to 3 days.

Invited players
Starting in First round
  Martin Adams (semi-finals)
  Bob Anderson (first round)
  Ronnie Baxter (first round)
  Larry Butler (first round)
  Peter Evison (first round)
  Terry Jenkins (quarter-finals)
  John Lowe (first round) 
  Peter Manley (quarter-finals)
  Kevin Painter (semi-finals)
  John Part (first round)
  Phil Taylor (runner-up)
  Robert Thornton (champion)

Starting in Preliminary round
  Lisa Ashton (quarter-finals)
  Keith Deller (preliminary round)
  Trina Gulliver (preliminary round)
  Deta Hedman (first round)
  Tony O'Shea (preliminary round)

Qualifiers
Starting in preliminary round
  Brian Dawson (first round)
  Paul Hogan (preliminary round)

Highest non-qualifier on WSDT Order of Merit
Starting in preliminary round
  Colin McGarry (quarter-finals)

Draw
The draw for the tournament was announced on 12 April 2022.

References

World Seniors Darts Matchplay
World Seniors Darts Matchplay
World Seniors Darts Matchplay